In zoology, a tentacle is a flexible, mobile, elongated organ present in some species of animals.

Tentacle or Tentacles may also refer to:

 Tentacle erotica, a type of pornography
 Tentacle (botany), glandular hairs on the leaves of some species of insectivorous plants such as sundews
 Tentacles (film), an Italian-American horror film
 Squidward Tentacles, a fictional character in the American animated television series SpongeBob SquarePants
 "Tentacles" (Into the Dark), an episode of the second season of Into the Dark